Tehuel de la Torre (born 26 March 1999) is an Argentine trans man who disappeared in the afternoon of 11 March 2021 when he left his home in San Vicente, Buenos Aires, heading for Alejandro Korn to meet Luis Alberto Ramos (37), whom had offered him a job as a waiter at a birthday party. His whereabouts remain unknown.

Disappearance
De la Torre was born on 26 March 1999. At the time of his disappearance, he lived in San Vicente, Buenos Aires, with his mother, his partner and her son, and his brother. De la Torre had started his gender transitioning a few months before his disappearance.

On 11 March 2021, De la Torre left his home heading for Alejandro Korn to meet Luis Alberto Ramos, a 37-year-old man whom he had met at several Workers' Socialist Movement rallies. Ramos had offered him a job as a waiter at a birthday party. On 13 March, his family reported his disappearance to the police. A destroyed phone and jacket belonging to De la Torre were found in a raid to Ramos' house on 16 March.

Ramos was arrested on 23 March and Oscar Alfredo Montes (46), a friend of Ramos, was arrested on 27 March. A picture of the three taken in Montes' house the day of the disappearance was found on 30 March. On 10 September a bloodstain belonging to De la Torre was found on a wall in Ramos' house.

On 9 November, Ramos and Montes were charged with aggravated homicide due to hatred of gender identity – a change from the original classification – and the prosecution took the case to trial.

In March 2022, a year after his disappearance, the Ministry of Security increased the reward to 5 million pesos (around US$36,000 in August 2022) for information about his whereabouts.

See also
List of people who disappeared

References

2020s missing person cases
LGBT in Argentina
Missing person cases in Argentina
Violence against trans men